Nachiketa (Sharma) Yakkundi (Kannada: ನಚಿಕೇತ, Devanagari:नचिकेत, IAST: Naciketā) is an Indian classical vocalist in the San Francisco Bay Area.

Background 
Born in Dharwad, Karnataka, Nachiketa was initiated into Hindustani classical vocal music by his parents. His formal study began in Madras under B. N. Simha and later under B. Hanumantachar. He then learnt from Basavaraj Rajguru.

Career 
Nachiketa has extensively performed in cities across India and North America. He runs Rajguru Sangeet Vidyaniketan, a school of music in the memory of his guru in Cupertino, California, a school for both adults and kids. Nachiketa was also a senior teacher at the Sangeetaanjali College of Music, Fremont for over 20 years until the institution closed its doors in October, 2015.

Discography 
 Samarpan (May 2002)
 Hindustani Vocal (May 2000)
 Dasa compositions in Kannada - Rama nama payasa (May 2002)
 Vachanas in Kannada - Neenolidare (May 2002)
 A two-CD Hindustani album titled Guru Naman consisting of nine raagas (May 2007)
 Sumiran Karle composed of seven Hindi bhajans, three composed by Nachiketa himself. (May 2007)

Nachiketa is a regular on local Bay Area TV introducing and demonstrating Hindustani music to viewers. He is also actively involved in composing music for many local (http://naatak.org)  as well as international-level organizations (http://www.akkaonline.org/2014/).

References

External links
Ganapriya
Sangeetaanjali

Indian Express, Aug 2010

Hindustani singers
People from Dharwad
Living people
Year of birth missing (living people)